Shanmugam is a Tamil male given name. Due to the Tamil tradition of using patronymic surnames it may also be a surname for males and females.

Notable people

Given name
 A. C. Shanmugam, Indian politician
 C. Shanmugam, Indian politician
 C. V. Shanmugam, Indian politician
 G. Shanmugam, Indian politician
 K. Shanmugam (born 1959), Singaporean politician and lawyer
 Kannon Shanmugam (born 1972), American lawyer
 M. Shanmugam, Indian politician
 N. T. Shanmugam, Indian politician
 P. Shanmugam (1927–2013), Indian politician
 P. Shanmugam (Tamil Nadu) (1946–2006), Indian politician
 P. U. Shanmugam (born 1923), Indian politician
 Parthiban Shanmugam, Indian writer and director
 R. Shanmugam, Indian politician
 R. K. Shanmukham Chetty (1892–1953), Indian lawyer, economist and politician
 Savithiri Shanmugam (1913–?), Indian National Congress politician
 Shanmugam Subbaiah (1930–2012), Indian film distributor
 T. K. Shanmugam (1912–1973), Indian actor

Surname
 Sanmugam Appacuddy Tharmalingam (born 1908), Sri Lankan physician and politician
 Sanmugam Arumugam (1905–2000), Ceylonese irrigation engineer and writer
 Shanmugam Jayakumar (born 1939), Singaporean politician, lawyer and diplomat
 Shanmugam Jegadhiswaran, Sri Lankan politician
 Shanmugam Kumaran Tharmalingam (born 1955), Sri Lankan militant
 Shanmugam Manjunath (1978–2005), Indian marketing manager
 Shanmugam Murugesu (1967–2005), Singaporean drug smuggler, soldier and athlete
 Shanmugam Shankar (born 1963), Indian film director and producer
 Shanmugam Venkatesh (born 1978), Indian footballer

See also
 
 
 

Tamil masculine given names